The Fifth-Column Mouse is a 1943 Warner Bros. Merrie Melodies animated cartoon directed by Friz Freleng. The short was released on March 6, 1943.

The cartoon features a band of mice who engage in war against a cat. This is a wartime propaganda film, with the cat symbolizing the Axis powers. A single mouse represents the fifth column, working for the cat and suggesting an appeasement policy.

Plot
The short film begins with a pleasant group of brown mice who are - to the tune of "Ain't We Got Fun" - enjoying various water sports and other fun activities in and around a kitchen sink. Lurking just outside the house is a sinister cat; after he gets inside he gains the confidence of a dim-witted grey mouse who has already underestimated the predator.  The cat persuades the easily manipulated rodent - via a promise of cheese, "all you want" - to impress upon the brown mice that he, the cat, is there to save them when, in actuality, he will enslave them.

The grey mouse follows the cat's orders and convinces his compatriots to appease. The brown mice indeed become slaves to the cat, fulfilling his every desire. Finally, he openly states that he wants to eat "a nice, fat, tender mouse". The brown mice flee; the grey mouse runs to join them when the cat turns his appetite toward him. The newly formed brown mouse united alliance prepares for war, constructing a 'secret weapon' to even the upcoming battle: a mechanical bulldog. The ensuing chase forces the cat from the house after being shaved nearly bald. As the brown mice celebrate the victory, the grey mouse tries to claim partial credit (quoting Red Skelton’s famous line "I Dood it"); in response, he is immediately pied.

References to World War II
The cat is treated as the enemy and symbolizes the Axis Powers. After the cat whispers his plan inside the dim-witted mouse's ear the cat's face briefly mimics that of a stereotypically caricatured Japanese, while Japanese sounding music is briefly heard. When the mouse agrees to fulfill the plan, he gives the cat a Nazi salute. The grey mouse represents the policy of appeasement, and the overall theme of the short is that the policy does not work against the Axis and will lead to ruin. When the cat's fur is shaved off, the first four notes of Ludwig van Beethoven's "Fifth Symphony" are played; these notes were used by the Allied Forces as a symbol for "V" (for "victory") in Morse code; also, when shaved four tufts of hair are left on the cat's back - three short and one long tuft - equivalent to the Morse Code dit-dit-dit-dah - which is the letter "V".

Near the end of the cartoon, the brown mice sing “We did it before and We can do it again”, a patriotic chant that was often used in American films during World War II. The song was co-written in 1941 by Tin Pan Alley songwriter Charles Tobias (who also co-wrote the Merrie Melodies theme some years earlier) as a response to the sneak attack on Pearl Harbor. During the song, a mouse version of the "Buy War Bonds and Stamps" poster can be seen.

Home media
The Fifth-Column Mouse was released on Bugs & Daffy: The Wartime Cartoons (1989), and later on the Looney Tunes Golden Collection: Volume 6 DVD set. The cartoon is now in the public domain.

See also
 List of World War II short films

Notes

References

External links
 

Merrie Melodies short films
1943 animated films
1943 short films
American World War II propaganda shorts
Short films directed by Friz Freleng
World War II films made in wartime
Films produced by Leon Schlesinger
Films scored by Carl Stalling
1943 films
Films about mice and rats
Animated films about cats
1940s Warner Bros. animated short films
Films with screenplays by Michael Maltese